Ghymes is a band, consisting of Hungarians living in Slovakia, founded at the University of Education in Nitra in 1984, by musicians with different preliminary musical experiences from classical through rock and Renaissance music. Folk elements have gradually clung together with their own individual musical ideas.

In the year of 2000, Ghymes had the opportunity to attend two events: the World Expo 2000 in Hanover (Day of Hungary) and the official celebrations of the New Millennium in Hungary (St, Stephen's day, August 20, 2000).

Smaragdváros (Emerald City) was produced by EMI Records and came out in Hungary in November 2000. In March 2001, it was #11 on the World Music Charts Europe.

On December 24, 2018, the band performed a Christmas concert, Mennyből az angyal [Angel from heaven], which broadcast on national television (Duna Televizio). The Ghymes band performed together with the Hungarian Radio's children's choir.

Members
 Gyula Szarka - lead vocal, contrabass, guitar, calabash zither, fretless bass, lute, vocals
 Tamás Szarka - lead vocal, violin, koboz (Hungarian lute), guitar, contrabass, fretless bass, percussion, bass drum, calabash zither, vocals
 Csaba Kún - synthesizer, vocals
 Péter Jelasity - alto and soprano saxophone, flute
 András Jász - alto saxophone
 Szabolcs Nagy - synthesizer, bass drum, vocals
 Tamás Széll - percussion, drums
 János Lau - percussion, drums
 Imre Molnár - contrabass, vocals
 Bori Varga - alto and soprano saxophone, Turkish pipe, recorder, bassoon, vocals

Discography
 1988: Az ifjúság sólyommadár (Youth as Falcon)
 1991: Ghýmes
 1993: Üzenet (Message)
 1995: Bennünk van a kutyavér (Dog's Blood's Inside Us)
 1996: Tűzugrás (Firejump)
 1998: Rege (Legend)
 2000: Smaragdváros (Emerald City)
 2001: Üzenet (Message - latest release)
 2002: Héjavarázs (Hawkspell)
 2003: Ghymes koncert (Ghymes Concert)
 2004: éGHYMESe (Sky Thale)
 2005: Csak a világ végire... (Only to the Edge of the World)
 2006: Messzerepülő (Farflyer)
 2007: Mendika
 2008: Álombálom (My Dream Ball)
 2010: Szikraszemű (Spark-eyed)
 2016: Mennyből az angyal

Other releases
 2001: A nagy mesealbum (The Big Album of Fairy Tales - various artists)
 2002: Bakaballada (Soldier's Ballad - with Hobo)
 2003: A nagy mesealbum II. (The Big Album of Fairy Tales II)
 2006: Üvegtigris 2 (Glass Tiger 2)

Members releases
Gyula Szarka
 2004: Alku (Deal)
 2007: Bor és a lányka (Wine and the Girl)
Tamás Szarka
 2004: Anonymus

References

External links
 official Ghymes website

Hungarian rock music groups
Hungarian folk rock groups